Rukhtino is a rural locality (a selo) and the administrative centre of Rukhtinsky Selsoviet, Duvansky District, Bashkortostan, Russia. The population was 676 as of 2010. There are 7 streets.

Geography 
Rukhtino is located 14 km southeast of Mesyagutovo (the district's administrative centre) by road. Anzyak is the nearest rural locality.

References 

Rural localities in Duvansky District